ChinaSat is the brand name of communications satellites operated by China Satellite Communications.

History 
In 2007, a joint venture China Direct Broadcast Satellite was formed to run the brand ChinaSat. It was a joint venture of state-owned companies China Satellite Communications, China Orient Telecommunications Satellite and Sino Satellite Communications. The latter was controlled by China Aerospace Science and Technology Corporation (CASC). However, China Satellite Communications was changed from a direct subsidiary of the State-owned Assets Supervision and Administration Commission of the State Council (SASAC) to a direct subsidiary of CASC in 2009, the joint venture was dissolved and Sino Satellite Communications became a subsidiary of China Satellite Communications.

The brand ChinaSat was previously operated by China Telecommunications Broadcast Satellite Corporation, which was owned by China's Ministry of Posts and Telecommunications. China Telecommunications Broadcast Satellite Corporation was merged with other state-owned companies to form China Satellite Communications Corporation circa 2000.

Satellites formerly operated by Sino Satellite Communications and China Orient Telecommunications Satellite were renamed with ChinaSat designations following the acquisition of China Satellite Communications by CASC. ChinaStar 1 became ChinaSat 5A, SinoSat 1 became ChinaSat 5B, and SinoSat 3 became ChinaSat 5C.

Satellites

ChinaSat 1x 
The Zhongxing-1x (or ChinaSat-1x) series includes four spacecraft as of September 2022. Despite the ChinaSat designation the satellites are reportedly to be Fenghuo-2 military communications satellites manufactured by CAST and based on the DFH-4 satellite bus. They follow the first generation of Fenghuo satellites, namely ChinaSat 22 and ChinaSat 22A. The first three satellites have been launched from the Xichang Satellite Launch Center using Long March-3B/G2 rockets while the fourth one has been launched from the Wenchang Space Launch Site using a Long March 7A rocket, and in particular:
 ChinaSat 1A was launched on 18 September 2011 at 16:33 UTC
 ChinaSat 1C was launched on 9 December 2015 at 16:46 UTC
 ChinaSat 1D was launched on 26 November 2021 at 16:40 UTC
 ChinaSat 1E was launched on 13 September 2022 at 13:18 UTC
The shift to a different launcher for the fourth satellite capable of carrying a greater mass to the intended geosynchronous orbit could indicate the use of a bigger and heavier satellite bus, possibly an upgraded version of the previously used DFH-4 bus.

ChinaSat 2A 
ChinaSat 2A was launched in 2012.

ChinaSat 2D 
Zhongxing-2D (or ChinaSat-2D) was launched at 17:05 UTC on 10 January 2019 from the Xichang Satellite Launch Center using a Long March-3B/G3 from the LA-2 launch complex.

ChinaSat 2E 
Zhongxing-2E (or ChinaSat-2E) was launched at 16:30 UTC on 5 August 2021 from the Xichang Satellite Launch Center using a Long March-3B/G3 from the LA-2 launch complex. The satellite is a military communication satellite and its real name is Shentong 2-05, with the ChinaSat denomination being a cover name.

ChinaSat 5A 
ChinaSat 5A was launched in 1998, formerly known as ChinaStar 1. It was leased to China Satellite Communications's subsidiary APT Satellite Holdings and renamed to Apstar 9A on 9 January 2014.

ChinaSat 5B 
ChinaSat 5B was launched in 1998, formerly known as Sinosat 1. It was sold to Pasifik Satelit Nusantara in 2012.

ChinaSat 5C 
ChinaSat 5C was launched in 2007, formerly known as SinoSat 3. It was leased to Eutelsat in 2011 (as Eutelsat 3A and then Eutelsat 8 West D).

ChinaSat 5D 
ChinaSat 5D was launched in 1996, formerly known as Apstar 1A. It was placed in geosynchronous orbit at a longitude of 51.5° East circa 2009. It was acquired by China Satellite Communications from subsidiary APT Satellite Holdings.

ChinaSat 5E 
ChinaSat 5E was launched in 1994, formerly known as Apstar 1. It was placed in geosynchronous orbit at a longitude of 142° East and moved to 163° East circa 2012. It was acquired by China Satellite Communications from subsidiary APT Satellite Holdings.

ChinaSat 6 
ChinaSat 6 (ZX 6, DHF-3 2) is a geostationary communications satellite and as its predecessor (DHF-3 1) it's based on the DHF-3 satellite bus. DHF-3 1 was launched on 29 November 1994 but didn't reach its intended orbit and was declared lost, while ChinaSat 6 was launched on 11 May 1997 and reached its intended orbit but experienced technical malfunctions that could reduce its operational life. Both launches took place in Xichang Satellite Launch Center using Long March 3A rockets.

ChinaSat 6A/6D 
ChinaSat 6A (ZX 6A) was launched in 2010. Formerly known as SinoSat 6, it's a communications satellite based on the DFH-4 satellite bus. It was launched on 4 September 2010 at 16:14 UTC from the Xichang Satellite Launch Center using a Long March 3B rocket, but after launch the satellite suffered problems in the helium pressurization system, which lead to a significant reduction of the operational life to only 11 years. For this reason it was replaced in 2022 by ChinaSat 6D (ZX-6D), based on the upgraded DHF-4E satellite bus, that was launched on 15 April 2022 at 12:00 from the Xichang Satellite Launch Center using a Long March 3B/E.

ChinaSat 6B 
The ChinaSat 6B satellite was manufactured by Thales Alenia Space, based on the Spacebus 4000C2 platform. It has 38 transponders, and is being used for TV transmissions and shortwave jamming across China, Southeast Asia, the Pacific and Oceania. It has a planned useful life of 15 years. The launch, on a Long March 3B launch vehicle, was successfully conducted on 5 July 2007. The broadcast used for some shortwave radio jamming purposes in China is carried on one of the Chinasat 6B transponders.

United States ITAR restrictions prohibited the export of satellite components for satellites launched on Chinese rockets. In response, Thales Alenia built ChinaSat 6B as an ITAR-free satellite, containing no restricted U.S. satellite components. However, the U.S. Department of State did not accept the ITAR-free status of these satellites and fined the U.S. company Aeroflex US$8 million for exporting satellite components. In 2013, Thales Alenia discontinued its ITAR-free satellite line.

ChinaSat 7 
ChinaSat 7, a geosynchronous communications satellite launched in 1996, experienced third stage failure and a nearly unusable orbit.

ChinaSat 8 

ChinaSat 8 was built by Space Systems/Loral and scheduled for launch in April 1999 on a Long March 3B launch vehicle. However, the U.S. Department of State blocked its export to China under ITAR regulations. The satellite was sold to ProtoStar in 2006.

ChinaSat 9 

ChinaSat 9 (ZX-9) was built by Thales Alenia Space and it's based on the Spacebus 4000C2 satellite bus. It was launched on 9 June 2008 at 12:15 UTC from the Xichang Satellite Launch Center using a Long March 3B rocket. It was intended to act as a relay satellite for the 2008 Olympic Games, and to be subsequently used for general communications.

ChinaSat 9A/9B 

ChinaSat 9A (ZX 9A) was initially intended to be a replacement for Sinosat's Sinosat-2 communication satellite with the name Sinosat-4, and as its predecessor it's based on the DFH-4 bus. In 2010 China Satcom took over the satellite and gave it the current name. It was launched on 16 June 2017 at 16:12 UTC from the Xichang Satellite Launch Center using a Long March 3B/E rocket, but failed to reach the intended orbit due to an upper stage failure. After 16 days of orbit raising maneuvers it reached the planned geosynchronous orbit, but at the expense of 10 years of lifespan (out of 15).

Due to its shorter than intended lifespan a replacement based on the upgraded DHF-4E bus, named ChinaSat 9B (ZX 9B), was launched on 9 September 2021 from the Xichang Satellite Launch Center using a Long March 3B/E rocket reaching its orbit without any issues.

ChinaSat 10 

ChinaSat 10 was based on the DFH-4 bus. It was launched in 2011. Formerly known as SinoSat 5.

ChinaSat 11 
ChinaSat 11 was based on the DFH-4 bus. It was launched in May 2013. ChinaSat 11 is used for Ninmedia, a free Indonesian TV network that provides many Indonesian TV stations.

ChinaSat 12 

ChinaSat 12 was launched in 2012. Formerly known as Apstar 7B. A backup of Apstar 7, Apstar 7B was acquired by China Satellite Communications from its subsidiary APT Satellite Holdings in 2010. It was based on Thales Alenia Space Spacebus-4000C2.

ChinaSat 15 

ChinaSat 15, aka Belintersat-1, was based on the DFH-4 satellite bus. It was launched on 16 January 2016, at 00:57 (Beijing time).

ChinaSat 16 
Initially known as Shijian 13 (SJ 13), the satellite was launched on 12 April 2017 at 11:04:04 UTC into geostationary transfer orbit using a Long March 3B/E launch vehicle. As the Shijian designation suggests, it is an experimental satellite that is supposed to test the electric propulsion of the DFH-4S satellite bus. The satellite has also been used for Ka-band high bandwidth communications experiments for in-flight internet services, achieving an internet access capability of 150 Mbit/s. After its experimental phase, it was transferred to China Satcom which is currently operating it as ChinaSat 16 (ZX 16).

ChinaSat 18 
ChinaSat 18 was launched at 12:03 UTC on 19 August 2019 from the Xichang Satellite Launch Center using a Long March-3B/E from the LA-2 launch complex. Although the launch was successful, the satellite would later malfunction in orbit and was later declared a total loss just after three months.

ChinaSat 19 
ChinaSat 19 (ZX 19) is a communications satellite launched on 5 November 2022 at 11:50 UTC from the Xichang Satellite Launch Center using a Long March-3B/E from the LA-2 launch complex. The satellite is presumed to carry out the original duties of the ChinaSat 18.

ChinaSat 26 
ChinaSat 26 (ZX 26) is a communications satellite launched on 23 February 2023 at 11:49 UTC, from the Xichang Satellite Launch Center using a Long March 3B/E rocket from the LA-2 launch complex. It's China's first high-throughput satellite with a previously unmatched capacity of over 100 Gbit/s.

References 

Satellites orbiting Earth
Communications satellites of China
Communications satellite constellations
Spacecraft launched by Long March rockets